The Sri Lanka cricket team toured South Africa in December 2020 and January 2021 to play two Test matches. The Test series formed part of the inaugural 2019–2021 ICC World Test Championship. Ahead of the tour, Quinton de Kock was named as the Test captain of South Africa's side.

In December 2020, South Africa's One Day International (ODI) against England was postponed due to the COVID-19 pandemic. As a result, Sri Lanka Cricket (SLC) did look at the possibility of playing the series in Sri Lanka, or withdrawing from touring South Africa. However, after discussions between both cricket boards, Sri Lanka Cricket's medical staff said they were pleased with the bio-security arrangements.

South Africa won the first Test by an innings and 45 runs, with Faf du Plessis scoring a career-best 199 runs. South Africa won the second Test by ten wickets winning the series 2–0.

Squads

Angelo Mathews was ruled out of Sri Lanka's squad after suffering an injury during the semi-finals of the 2020 Lanka Premier League tournament. On 16 December 2020, Migael Pretorius was added to South Africa's Test squad. Two days later, Dwaine Pretorius, Raynard van Tonder and Lutho Sipamla were also added to South Africa's squad. On 22 December 2020, Beuran Hendricks and Keegan Petersen were withdrawn from South Africa's squad, after both players tested positive for COVID-19. On the first day of the first Test, Dhananjaya de Silva suffered a grade two tear in left thigh, and was ruled out of Sri Lanka's squad for the rest of the tour. On 28 December 2020, Kagiso Rabada was added to South Africa's squad for the second Test. Two days later, Beuran Hendricks was reinstated to South Africa's squad for the second Test, with Migael Pretorius being released due to a shoulder injury.

Test series

1st Test

2nd Test

Statistics

Most runs

Most wickets

English cricket team in Sri Lanka in 2020-21

Notes

References

External links
 Series home at ESPN Cricinfo

2020 in South African cricket
2021 in South African cricket
2020 in Sri Lankan cricket
2021 in Sri Lankan cricket
International cricket competitions in 2020–21
Sri Lankan cricket tours of South Africa